The 1898 Northwestern Purple team represented Northwestern University during the 1898 Western Conference football season. In their first and only year under head coach W. H. Bannard, the Purple compiled a 9–4–1 record (0–4 against Western Conference opponents) and finished in last place in the Western Conference. The team lost all four of its games against Western Conference opponents (Chicago, Michigan, Minnesota and Wisconsin) by a combined total of 104 to 16.

Schedule

References

Northwestern
Northwestern Wildcats football seasons
Northwestern Purple football